Patrick Bloche (born 4 July 1956 in Neuilly-sur-Seine) is a French politician and a member of the National Assembly of France. He is a member of the Socialist Party and works with the SRC parliamentary group.

Life
He has been a Member of the Socialist Party since the age of 16 (1972), is a member of the General Council of Paris, and has been a member of the Paris City Council since June 1995.

First, a close collaborator of Georges Sarre, it is long-standing member of CERES.  But in 1991, he was one of the supporters of the commitment of France in the Gulf War, and for this reason he broke definitively with Jean-Pierre Chevenement and Georges Sarre.

In January  2000, he was supported by Daniel Vaillant and Bertrand Delanoë (Chairman of the Socialist Group in the Council of Paris), and he was elected with over 61% of the votes of members to the post of first secretary of the Parti Socialiste Paris federation, where he succeeded Jean-Marie Le Guen, who resigned on 23 November 1999.

He has been a member of parliament for the Socialist Party since 1997, the year of the dissolution of the National Assembly by Jacques Chirac, in the 7th district of Paris (XI e XII arrondissement). He was president of the Law Committee and Rapporteur of the proposed Act PACS, which he was co-authored with Jean-Pierre Michel. Reelected in 2002, he is in his third term, since his re-election in June 2007, with 62.44% of the vote against Claude-Annick Tissot (UMP).

He led the Socialist list in 2008 French municipal elections, in the XIth district, and was elected Mayor of the Borough, on 29 March 2008.
In 2009, he opposed the draft HADOPI law, and defended as an alternative the blanket license.  In 2011, he opposed a "freedom of panorama" amendment, calling it an « amendement Wikipédia ».

On 13 July 2011 he joined the campaign team of Martine Aubry, for her Parti Socialiste primary campaign, which she lost to the eventual President of France François Hollande.   He is responsible, along with Sandrine Bonnaire, for Culture Media subjects.

He is Vice Chairman of Study Group on the issue of Tibet to the National Assembly.

He is president of the Commission des affaires culturelles et de l’éducation during the Hollande government.  The committee voted in favour of an amendment proposed by Martine Faure, and favoured by Yves Durand, Martine Martinel and Marie-George Buffet among others, that replaced the biological concepts of "sex", with the sociological concepts of "gender" in the national elementary curriculum. The elementary curriculum was successfully revised in September 2013 under the name "l'ABCD de l'egalite".

References

1956 births
Living people
People from Neuilly-sur-Seine
Socialist Party (France) politicians
French city councillors
Tibet freedom activists
Deputies of the 12th National Assembly of the French Fifth Republic
Deputies of the 13th National Assembly of the French Fifth Republic
Deputies of the 14th National Assembly of the French Fifth Republic
Councillors of Paris